Big East tournament or Big East championship may refer to:

Big East men's basketball tournament, the men's basketball championship
Big East women's basketball tournament, the women's basketball championship
Big East baseball tournament, the baseball championship
Big East Conference football championship